Andimuthu Raja (born Sathyaseelan; 26 October 1963) is an Indian politician from Tamil Nadu, who serves as Member of Parliament for the Nilgiris constituency and deputy general secretary for the Dravida Munnetra Kazhagam. He was a member of the 15th Lok Sabha representing the Nilgiris constituency of Tamil Nadu and had been elected to house four times since 1996. Raja is an advocate by profession and he did his masters from Government Law College in Tiruchirappalli. 

Raja was first elected to Parliament as a member of Lok Sabha in 1996 from the Perambalur constituency and was reelected from the same constituency in 1999 and 2004 elections and from Nilgiris constituency in 2009. He was Minister of State for Rural development from 1996 to 2000, Minister of State, Health and Family Welfare from September 2000 to May 2004 and a cabinet minister for Environment and Forests from May 2004 to May 2007. He became the cabinet minister for Communication and Information Technology from May 2007, following the resignation of Dayanidhi Maran. Raja was investigated in the 2G Spectrum case, along with two other members of the DMK, Dayanidhi Maran and Kanimozhi. All three were acquitted in 2017. Raja was re-elected as Nilgiris MP in the 2019 Lok Sabha elections, and was elected Deputy General Secretary of the DMK in September 2020.

Early life
Raja was born to S.K.Aandimuthu and Chinnapillai Ammal Andimadam of the day Perambalur District of Tamil Nadu. His grandparents, who belong to a Dalit community, went from Velur in Perambalur district to Sri Lanka to work on the tea estates. They returned to India in the 1950s, and Raja's father returned in 1961. In high school in Perambalur, Raja was first introduced to Periyar and Dravidar Kazhagam. He quickly became interested in the atheistic, rationalistic Dravidian ideology, along with those of Ambedkar and Marx. He did his B.Sc. in Mathematics from the Government Arts College in Musiri, but was disinterested in the subject, and was drawn to politics and writing instead. He completed his graduation in law from the Government Law College in Madurai and his masters from Government Law College Tiruchirapalli. He was married to M. A. Parameswari and the couple have a daughter named Mayuri. Parameswari died of cancer on 29 May 2021.She was aged 54.

Political career
Raja started his political career in his final year of undergraduate, when he joined DMK students wing, and quickly rose through party ranks. When Vaiko was expelled from DMK, Raja was recommended by Rajya Sabha MP S Siva Subramaniam and KN Nehru for the DMK's candidature in Perambalur for 1996 Lok Sabha elections. He won, and entered Parliament.

Elections contested

Positions held
   1996: Elected to Lok Sabha (Eleventh) for the 1st time
   13 October 1996-29 September 2000: Minister of State, Rural Development
   May 1999: Elected to Lok Sabha (Thirteenth) for the second time
   30 September 2000-21 May 2004: Minister of State, Health and Family Welfare
   May 2004: Elected to Lok Sabha (Fourteenth) for the third time from Perambalur
   23 May 2004-17 May 2007: Cabinet minister for Environment and Forest
   18 May 2007-31 May 2009: Cabinet minister for Communication and Information Technology
   May 2009: Elected to Lok Sabha (Fifteenth) for the fourth time from Nilgiris

As a minister

Raja was deputed as the Minister of State, Rural Development on 13 October 1996 and he continued to retain the post till 29 September 2000. On 30 September 2001, he was deputed as the minister of state for Health and Family welfare during the National Democratic Alliance. In December 2003, the DMK pulled out of the alliance and Raja resigned his minister's post along with his other DMK colleagues. He continued with the same ministry after the 2004 elections which was won by the Congress led alliance, which included the DMK. His tenure as an Environment ministry came under intense scrutiny in 2011 during the 2G Spectrum case. His association with the key accused in the 2G case, Unitech and DB Realty, was rooted to 2004 when he was the Environment minister. One of the key points out of the CBI is the approval of 2016 clearances given by his ministry in a span of two years from 2006 to 2008, some of which were associated with the trading of hazardous waste. The other issue raised was about the large majority of Raja's supporters in the expert appraisals committee (EAC), responsible for granting clearances to various sectors.

In 2007 May, Dinakaran, the newspaper run by Kalanidhi Maran, the elder brother of Dayanidhi Maran who was the central minister for IT and Communication, ran into a controversy when it published the results of a series of opinion polls which showed M. K. Stalin, the second son of Karunanidhi, having more approval (70%) than his elder brother M. K. Azhagiri (2%) as the political heir of Karunanidhi. It also showed others as 20%, possibly indicating Dayanidhi Maran and Kanimozhi. The Madurai office of Dinakaran was fire bombed by supporters of Alagiri and three employees were killed. The Sun TV office in Madurai was also attacked by the perpetrators. A day after the incident, Prime Minister Manmohan Singh and Sonia Gandhi came to Chennai for felicitating Karunanidhi for 50 years in legislative assembly.  Dayanidhi Maran, who usually accompanies Karunanidhi at every function, discarded the event as a mark of protest.  On 13 May, the DMK administrative committee empowered Karunanidhi to remove Dayanidhi from the party. This subsequently led to his resignation from the central ministry. Following his resignation, the IT portfolio was allocated to Raja on 16 May 2007. On 17 October 2008, he submitted his post-dated resignation to the DMK party chief, M. Karunanidhi, in protest of the killings of Tamil civilians in Sri Lanka.

2G spectrum case

The 2G spectrum financial scandal involved the alleged corrupt sale in 2008 of telecommunications bandwidth to selected organizations at prices that understated the real market value of the asset. It is alleged that the sale should have been put under a transparent auction system.

A first information report filed by the Central Bureau of Investigation (CBI) claims that the allocation was not done as per market prices. The Comptroller and Auditor General (CAG) holds Raja personally responsible for the sale of 2G spectrum at 2001 rates in 2008. In August 2010, evidence was submitted by the CAG showing that Raja had personally signed and approved the majority of the questionable allocations. Although the political opposition was demanding his resignation over the 2G spectrum case, Raja initially refused to resign, stating his innocence, and this view was backed by his party president M. Karunanidhi. He eventually resigned on 14 November 2010.

In 2011, the results of an investigation by retired judge Shivraj Patil, who was appointed by then telecom minister Kapil Sibal, also found Raja to have been directly responsible for "procedural lapses" regarding the sale. The CBI and Enforcement Directorate estimated that Raja could have made as much as Rs 30 billion from the alleged bribes.

In January and February 2011, Raja's houses and offices were raided by the CBI, who seized computers as potential evidence. On 2 February 2011, the CBI arrested Raja with his aide, R. K. Chandolia, and Siddharth Behura, the former telecom secretary and placed them in Tihar jail. Raja and R.K. Chandolia are heard in conversation with Niira Radia in the released Radia tapes.

Subsequent to his arrest, the DMK supported him on the basis that he was innocent until proven guilty.

On 6 June 2012, Delhi court permitted Raja to visit Tamil Nadu between 8 and 30 June, on grounds of discharging his previous duties in the state.

On 15 May 2012, he was granted bail by the Supreme court under a condition that he would not visit the Department of Telecommunications nor his home state Tamil Nadu. He stayed in Tihar jail for fifteen months. The Enforcement Directorate grilled Raja on 10 July 2012 for four hours, to ascertain his role in grant of 2G licenses especially to Swan Telecom and Unitech Wireless.

Delhi court on 21 December 2017 acquitted all accused, including former Telecom Minister A. Raja and DMK Rajya Sabha member Kanimozhi in the 2G spectrum allocation case and held that the 2G spectrum scam never happened in the first place.

Involvement in real estate
Sadiq Batcha, a close friend of Raja's, shifted his base to Chennai from his hometown of Perambalur, after Raja became a central minister in 2004. He started a real estate firm called Green House Promoters, which had Raja's nephew Paramesh Kumar as joint managing director and Raja's brother A Kaliyaperumal and Raja's wife Parameswari as directors. Parameswari resigned from the post on account of investigations. Batcha started another real estate firm in 2008 called Equals Estates Pvt Ltd, which had Parameswari as a director. The firm had a turnover of 755 crores in two years, mainly attributed to the association of Raja. Batcha was put under the CBI scanner during the 2G spectrum case as they believed him to be the conduit for Raja. On 16 March 2011, Batcha was found dead in his Chennai residence. Police found a suicide note that read the reason as the excessive media coverage that maligned his image. Police registered a case under suspicious circumstances under Section 174 of the IPC.

Controversies

Separate nation for Tamil Nadu 
On 3rd July 2022, A Raja said that the Union government is not giving the state autonomy and the Prime Minister and the Home Minister should not force them into demanding a "thani nadu" (separate nation) while speaking at a meeting held for DMK local body representatives, in the presence of Chief Minister M K Stalin.“Prime Minister Narendra Modi says all states are to be seen the same, and Home Minister Amit Shah says if you want unity, learn Hindi. The party’s founding father Periyar, until [his] death, demanded a thani nadu. But we (DMK) kept aside that demand for our democracy and national integrity, So, I am saying this with the utmost humility. Our CM is travelling in Anna’s [C. N. Annadurai] path so far, do not push us into following Periyar’s path. Do not make us revive our demand for a separate state”DMK immediately distanced itself from the comments and said that the comments made in support of a separate nation is not the stand of the party.

Books

See also
 List of scandals in India
 Sadiq Batcha
 Suresh Kalmadi
 Justice A.K. Ganguly

References

External links
 

1963 births
Living people
India MPs 1996–1997
India MPs 1999–2004
India MPs 2004–2009
India MPs 2009–2014
Indian Tamil people
Health ministers of India
Members of the Cabinet of India
Dravida Munnetra Kazhagam politicians
Union Ministers from Tamil Nadu
Lok Sabha members from Tamil Nadu
People from Perambalur district
Candidates in the 2014 Indian general election
2G spectrum case
India MPs 2019–present
Inmates of Tihar Jail
People charged with corruption